Kimberley Dos Santos (born 26 February 1998) is a Luxembourgish footballer who plays as a midfielder for Racing FC Union Luxembourg and the Luxembourg women's national team.

Career
Dos Santos has been capped for the Luxembourg national team, appearing for the team during the 2019 FIFA Women's World Cup qualifying cycle.

International goals

References

External links
 
 
 

1998 births
Living people
Luxembourgian women's footballers
Luxembourg women's international footballers
Luxembourgian people of Cape Verdean descent
Women's association football midfielders